Rohault Lake is a freshwater body of the unorganized territory of Lac-Ashuapmushuan, Quebec, in the western part of Le Domaine-du-Roy, in the administrative region of Saguenay-Lac-Saint-Jean, in province of Quebec, in Canada. This lake extends into the townships of Rohault, Robert and Ducharme (near the mouth).

Forestry is the main economic activity of the sector. Recreational tourism activities come second.

The western part of the Lake Rohault hydrographic slope is accessible via the R1032 forest road (North-South direction). The forest road route 167 passes north-east of Nicabau Lake, connecting Chibougamau to Saint-Félicien, Québec. The Canadian National Railway runs along this road. The northern part of lake Rohault is served by the forest road serving the Nemenjiche River.

The surface of lake Rohault is usually frozen from early November to mid-May, however, safe ice circulation is generally from mid-November to mid-April.

Geography

Toponymy 
The toponym "Lac Rohault" was formalized on December 5, 1968, by the Commission de toponymie du Quebec.

Notes and references

See also 

Lakes of Saguenay–Lac-Saint-Jean
Le Domaine-du-Roy Regional County Municipality